Nightmares of Futures Past is a role-playing game adventure published by TSR in 1987 for the Marvel Super Heroes role-playing game.

Contents
Nightmares of Futures Past is a scenario for the Advanced rules featuring the X-Men, set in a bleak alternate future where mutants are hunted down by huge robot Sentinels and imprisoned in concentration camps. It is first in a series of four.

Publication history
MX1 Nightmares of Futures Past was written by Steve Winter, with a cover by John Statema and Mike Machlan, and was published by TSR, Inc., in 1987 as a 32-page book, a map, and an outer folder.

Reception

Reviews
Adventurer #11 (June/July, 1987)

References

Marvel Comics role-playing game adventures
Role-playing game supplements introduced in 1987